White Bear Lake Area High School (abbreviated WBLAHS) is a high school in White Bear Lake, Minnesota, United States. The school was formed by merging White Bear High School (WBHS) and White Bear Mariner High School in the 1983–84 school year. It currently consists of two campuses and an alternative learning center. North Campus houses grades nine and ten, while South Campus serves grades eleven and twelve, and also contains a special education section separate from the high school. WBLAHS is the only school in the state of Minnesota with grades 9–10 and 11–12 in different buildings.

Campuses

North Campus 
North Campus, the previous White Bear High School, is located in the north side of White Bear Lake, north west of downtown White Bear Lake, and was built in 1964. The school houses students grades 9–10. The campus features some unique architectural design elements, including circular hallways.

South Campus 
What is now known as South Campus was built in 1971 and opened late in the Summer of '72 as White Bear Mariner High School. In contrast to North Campus, South's floor plan was originally open, consisting of only minimal walls between classrooms. In 1983, upon merging with White Bear High School, the building was remodeled to hold grades eleven and twelve, and a more traditional design was achieved by adding interior walls throughout. The building has since been expanded multiple times. In the early 1990s ten classrooms were added in the southeast corner of the building.  A weight room and fitness center was added in 2005. The Mariner Theater stage was renovated in 2010, converting the space from a lecture hall/small stage theater to an acoustic venue.

The South Campus houses a self-contained secondary special education school, operated and owned by Intermediate District 916 North East Metro School District, as well as special education classrooms.  This facility was renovated in 2009.

Area Learning Center 
Housed in the former Golfview Elementary, a few blocks away from South Campus, is White Bear Lake's alternative secondary program. This school houses secondary students grades 10–12 who are unable to participate in a traditional high school environment, including those who are not achieving to their potential, are parents, or have a day job. The building also contains the Insight program, a curriculum designed for students recovering from drug abuse and addictions.

Planned Merger 
On November 9, 2019, voters in the White Bear Lake School District approved a plan that would make changes to the buildings in the district. The project included expanding North Campus for it to become the district's only high school. South Campus would become the new location of Sunrise Park Middle School, one of two middle schools in the district. Construction for this merger is in progress, and is projected to be completed during the 2024–25 school year.

Athletics

Football
White Bear High School won the Minnesota State Class AA Football Championship in 1976. The team posted a 12–0 record and finished the season with a 14–13 overtime win over Cloquet. The team held opponents to an average of less than one touchdown per game.  As the only undefeated large school class (AA) football team in Minnesota, the 1976 Bears received a ranking of No. 17th in the Nation.

Lacrosse
The 2007 boys Lacrosse team won the MBSLA State Championship with an undefeated season going 15–0. The Bears outscored their opponents with a 199 to 46 goal differential. 2007 was the first year that the Minnesota State High School League recognized Lacrosse as a state sanctioned sport leaving it up to the individual school districts to determine whether or not it was feasible to enter the MSHSL. Prior to the 2007 year each high school team played in the Minnesota Boys Scholastic Lacrosse Association (MBSLA), White Bear Lake Area H.S. officials cited budgetary issues as the reason for waiting to officially join the MSHSL in 2008. The Bears officially entered the MBSLA for competition in 2005. The Bears went to the MSHsL State semi-finals in 2013. The Bears went on to win the 2015 MSHSL State Championship.

Archery
The White Bear Lake Archery team won the state tournament for Minnesota in 2006, 2007, 2008, 2009, and 2010.

The White Bear Lake Archery team has competed in the National tournament held in Kentucky since 2004. The team ranked 40th of 192 high school teams in 2015.

Bowling
The White Bear Lake Bowling Team won the state title in 2005. White Bear Lake also posted a state championship in 2008. It had two top 6 athletes in the state in 2009.

Other Activities

FIRST Robotics 
The White Bear Lake FIRST robotics team #2207, the Bright Bears, was added as a school activity during the 2007 school year. Every year the team builds a single robot to compete in the FIRST Robotics Competition hosted at the University of Minnesota. At the 2017 North Star Regional, in Mariucci Arena, University of Minnesota, the team was ranked 35 out of 60 teams competing, with 4 wins, and 4 losses.

Drumline 
The White Bear Lake Drumline took part in the 2018 Super Bowl parade held at U.S. Bank Stadium for Super Bowl LII.

Theater 
The program involves White Bear Lake High School students of all grades in musicals and plays. In recent years, White Bear Lake has featured such musicals as Grease, Oklahoma!, Beauty and the Beast, Urinetown, West Side Story, and How to Succeed in Business Without Really Trying, Addams Family, Nice Work If You Can Get It, and Mary Poppins. They have also produced plays such as Much Ado About Nothing, Twelve Angry Men, and Treasure Island.

Sister Schools 
Hangzhou Foreign Language School

Notable alumni 
Ami Wazlawik - Member of the Minnesota House of Representatives
John Kriesel - Motivational speaker, radio Personality and former member of the Minnesota House of Representatives
Paul M Nakasone - Four-star general, Commander of United States Cyber Command, Director of the National Security Agency, and Chief of the Central Security Service

Athletes
Jim Brunzell (University of Minnesota and AWA and WWE)
Bill Butters (University of Minnesota and NHL)
Justin Braun (UMass and NHL)
Brian Bonin (1996 Hobey Baker Award winner and 1992 Minnesota Mr. Hockey award winner)
Tony Benshoof (Olympic luge) 
Matt Henderson (University of North Dakota and NHL)
Ryan Carter Minnesota State University, Mankato  (NHL 2007 Stanley Cup Winner)
Jeff Parker (WB Mariner 83) Michigan State University and NHL.

References

External links
 White Bear Lake Area High School
 Area Learning Center
 Insight Program
 White Bear Lake District (624) Website
 Northeast Metro Intermediate District (916) Website

1983 establishments in Minnesota
Educational institutions established in 1983
Public high schools in Minnesota
Schools in Ramsey County, Minnesota